Cóiced Ol nEchmacht is an ancient name for the province of Connacht, Ireland and including the area of County Clare.

Etymology and extent

Cóiced Ol nEchmacht may be translated as the portion/fifth/province of the Ol nEchmacht, also called the Fir Ol nEchmacht ("Fir" means "men"). The name nEchmacht has been linked by some scholars to the tribe called Nagnatae on Ptolemy's 2nd century AD world map.

They were divided into three main tribes: the Fir Craibe, or Fir na Criabe; the Tuatha Taiden; and the Gamanraige. Each tribe ruled respective kingdoms within Ol nEchmacht.

The kingdom of the Fir Craibe extended from Limerick to the Palace of Fidach, a place thought to be located in north-eastern Aidhne. In later centuries the territory south of Aidhne, Thomond, would be annexed by Munster, which it is still counted as part of.
The kingdom of Tuatha Taiden extended from Fidach eastwards to and across the Shannon towards Tara, and was probably co-extensive with Hy-Many at its greatest extent.
The Gamanraige ruled the territory between the Gallimhe or Galway river, to the Drowes and Duff rivers in the north-east. Their capital was Rath Eochaidh, later called Cruachan.
This territory seems to have been Ol nEchmacht proper.

It was only with the rise of the Connachta dynasty that the term Fir Ol nEchmacht was dropped and the province was renamed Connacht.

Nations of Ol nEchmacht

Nations known to have resided in Ol nEchmacht during this era included:

 Badhna             - uncertain
 Bunrath        - north of Athenry/south-west of Tuam
 Cairpre        - around Drumcliffe in County Sligo
 Calraige           - border of County Sligo/County Leitrim
 Cattraige          - uncertain
 Ciarraige          - central Mayo
 Clann Úmóir        - Aran Islands, Galway and Mayo
 Conmaicne      - west coast, and northern areas of, County Galway
 Corco Fhir Trí     - south County Sligo
 Corco Moga         - north-east County Galway
 Dál nDruithne      - east of Loughrea
 Dartraige      - north-west County Leitrim
 Delbhna        - south County Roscommon, and both sides of the Corrib
 Erdini         - County Leitrim/County Cavan
 Fir Craibe     - County Clare (then part of Connacht) and south-west Galway
 Fir Domnann    - west coast of Mayo
 Gabraige           - along the River Suck
 Gamanrad           - west shore of Killala Bay
 Gailenga           - central County Mayo
 Luigne         - east County Mayo & south County Sligo
 Mairtine Mór   - branch of a Munster nation, possibly located in Connacht
 Medraige           - nowadays the townlands of Maree, Oranmore
 Nagnatae       - County Sligo
 Óic Bethra     - area around Clarenbridge
 Partraige          - in Connemara and Partry, County Mayo
 Senchineoil    - centered on what is now Ballinasloe
 Soghain        - most of east-central County Galway
 Tuatha Taiden  - east Galway and south Roscommon
 Uaithne        - County Roscommon/County Galway (likely Ptolemy's Auteini)
 Uí Mail            - the area around Clew Bay

External links
http://www.rootsweb.com/~irlkik/ihm/ire150.htm

Sources
 Foras Feasa Eirann, Geoffrey Keating, 1636.
 Leabhar Mor nGenealach, Dubhaltach MacFhirbhisigh, 1649–1666.
 Ogygia, Ruaidhri O Flaithbheartaigh, 1684.
 The History of Mayo, T.H.Knox, 1908.

Kingdoms of ancient Ireland
History of County Galway
Connacht
Geography of County Galway
Ancient Ireland
Geographic history of Ireland